Atractus duboisi is a species of snake in the family Colubridae. The species can be found in Ecuador.

References 

Atractus
Reptiles of Ecuador
Endemic fauna of Ecuador
Reptiles described in 1880
Taxa named by George Albert Boulenger